Rudolf Steiner (7 April 1937 – 3 December 2015) was a German football player. He spent 6 seasons in the Bundesliga with TSV 1860 München. He represented Germany once in a friendly against Scotland.

Honours
 UEFA Cup Winners' Cup finalist: 1965.
 Bundesliga champion: 1966.
 Bundesliga runner-up: 1967.
 DFB-Pokal winner: 1964.

References

External links
 

1937 births
2015 deaths
German footballers
Germany international footballers
TSV 1860 Munich players
Bundesliga players
Association football defenders